Lars Dendoncker (born 3 April 2001) is a Belgian professional footballer who plays as a defender, most recently for Brighton & Hove Albion.

Club career
After beginning his career in the youth system of Club Brugge, Dendoncker joined the academy of Premier League club Brighton & Hove Albion on a two-year contract in 2020.

In August 2021, Dendoncker signed for Scottish Premiership club St Johnstone on a season-long loan. He made his debut for the club the following month, starting in a 3–1 win over Dundee. Dendoncker returned to his parent club in January 2022. He was released by Brighton in May 2022.

Personal life
Dendoncker is the youngest of three brothers. The middle child Leander played in the Premier League for Wolverhampton Wanderers and Aston Villa while being a senior international for Belgium, while eldest Andres played local football before becoming the agent of the other two.

Career statistics

References

2001 births
Living people
Belgian footballers
Association football defenders
Brighton & Hove Albion F.C. players
St Johnstone F.C. players
Scottish Professional Football League players